Labour Party leadership elections were held in the following countries in 2014:

2014 Labour Party leadership election (Ireland)
2014 New Zealand Labour Party leadership election
2014 Scottish Labour Party leadership election